The Battery Point Formation is a geologic formation in Quebec. It preserves fossils dating back to the early Emsian to early Eifelian the lower Devonian period.

Description
A part of the Gaspé Sandstones, the Battery Point Formation is believed to have been deposited in a fluvial environment based on the presence of rootlets as well as the abundance of trough and planar-tabular cross bedding, and the lower part resembles modern braided systems more than meandering systems. It rests unconformably on the shallow marine sandstones of the York River Formation (the basal unit of the Gaspé Sandstones and making the Battery Point Formation the first continental unit of the sequence), transitioning upwards into the Malbaie Formation, and is 2,300 meters (7,550 feet) thick.

Fossil content
Limited intervals in the lower part of the formation contain remains of a few brachiopods and bivalves, though marine fauna is not known from other parts of the formation. Plant and freshwater fish fossils are also known.

See also

 List of fossiliferous stratigraphic units in Quebec

References

 

Devonian Quebec
Devonian southern paleotemperate deposits